Verulux cypselurus, also known as the swallow-tail cardinalfish is a species of fish in the family Apogonidae. It is found in the Indo-Pacific Ocean.

References

External links
 

Verulux
Fish described in 1909